Ridykeulous is a curatorial initiative founded by artists Nicole Eisenman and A.L. Steiner. The project encourages exhibitions of queer and feminist art.

History
Founded in 2005, Ridykeulous mounts exhibitions and events primarily concerned with queer and feminist art, using humor to critique the art world as well as culture at large.

Collaborators include A.K. Burns, Aaron Johnson, Anna Sew Hoy, Celeste Dupuy-Spencer, Cody Critcheloe/SSION, Cyrus Saint Amand Poliakoff, Dana Schutz, Dawn Frasch, Dawn Kasper, Dawn Mellor, Dean Daderko, Eve Fowler, Math Bass, Robinson Fastwurms, Leidy Churchman, Ulrike Muller, Zackary Drucker, Suzanne Wright, Kathe Burkhart, Christian Lemerz, K8 Hardy, Lara Schnitger, Ashley Reid, Lindsay Brant, Lisa Sanditz, Daphne FItzpatrick, Lisi Raskin, Catherine Lord, Keith Boadwee, Ellen Lesperance & Jeanine Oleson, Carrie Moyer, Adam Rolston, Nicola Tyson, Melissa Logan/Chicks on Speed, Daniel Bozhkov, Rachel Harrison, Amy Sillman, L.M. Childs, Claude Wampler, Miranda Lichtenstein, Kathy Acker, Abe Ajay, Mike Albo, Artists Poster Committee (Frazier Dougherty, Jon Hendricks, Irving Petlin), Kathe Burkhart, Nao Bustamante, Jibz Cameron, Leidy Churchman, Dennis Cooper, Tracey Emin, Daniel Feinberg, Louise Fishman, Glen Fogel, Hollis Frampton, Simon Fujiwara, Gary Gissler, Guerilla Art Action Group (G.A.A.G.), Harmony Hammond, Kathleen Hanna and Toby Vail, I.U.D., Donald Judd, Zoe Leonard, Ali Liebegott, Lucy Lippard, Bernadette Mayer, Allyson Mitchell & Deirdre Logue, Eileen Myles, Chuck Nanney, Genesis Breyer P-Orridge, Laura Parnes, Adrian Piper, William Powhida, Ad Reinhardt, Carolee Schneemann, Nancy Spero, Kara Walker, and David Wojnarowicz.

Publications

Exhibitions

References

International artist groups and collectives